Sir Jonathan Frederick Pollock, 1st Baronet, PC (23 September 1783 – 28 August 1870) was a British lawyer and Tory politician.

Background and education
Pollock was the son of saddler David Pollock, of Charing Cross, London, and the elder brother of Field Marshal Sir George Pollock, 1st Baronet. An elder brother, Sir David Pollock, was a judge in India.

The Pollock family were a branch of that family of Balgray, Dumfriesshire; David Pollock's father was a burgess of Berwick-upon-Tweed, and his grandfather a yeoman of Durham. His business as a saddler was given the official custom of the royal family. Sir John Pollock, 4th Baronet, great-great-grandson of David Pollock, stated in Time's Chariot (1950) that David was, 'perhaps without knowing it', Pollock of Balgray, the senior line of the family (Pollock of Pollock or Pollock of that ilk) having died out.

Pollock was educated at St Paul's School and Trinity College, Cambridge. He was Senior Wrangler at Cambridge University. He is also thought to be one of the founding members of the Cambridge Union Society, along with Henry Bickersteth and Sir Edward Hall Alderson, both of Gonville and Caius College.

Political, legal and mathematical careers
Pollock was Member of Parliament (MP) for Huntingdon from 1831 to 1844. He served as Attorney General between 1834 and 1835 and 1841 and 1844 in the Tory administrations of Sir Robert Peel. In 1841 he was admitted to the Privy Council and in 1844 he was appointed Lord Chief Baron of the Exchequer, a post he held until 1868. Having been knighted on 29 December 1834, Pollock was created a Baronet, of Hatton in the County of Middlesex, on 2 August 1866. Apart from his political and legal career Pollock was elected a Fellow of the Royal Society in 1816.  He contributed a number of papers in mathematics to the Royal Society, including one on what is now known as the Pollock's conjecture.

Family
Pollock died in August 1870, aged 86, and was succeeded in the baronetcy by his eldest son, William, sometime Queen's Remembrancer. His fourth son, Charles Edward Pollock, apprenticed to his father, had no university education. He became a law reporter then co-serving Baron of the Court of Exchequer, becoming the last in that appeal court. Another son, George Frederick Pollock, was Master of the Supreme Court succeeded his eldest brother as Queen's Remembrancer.

Two of Pollock's grandsons became prominent lawyers: Sir Frederick Pollock, 3rd Baronet (d.1937), was Professor of Jurisprudence at the University of Oxford; Ernest Pollock, 1st Viscount Hanworth (d.1936), served as Master of the Rolls.

References

External links

 
Descendants of Sir Frederick Pollock, 1st Bt.
 
 
 Archives of Sir Frederick Pollock, 1st Baronet (Sir Jonathan Frederick Pollock and family fonds, R1358) are held at Library and Archives Canada

1783 births
1870 deaths
Baronets in the Baronetage of the United Kingdom
Attorneys General for England and Wales
Chief Barons of the Exchequer
Members of the Parliament of the United Kingdom for English constituencies
UK MPs 1831–1832
UK MPs 1832–1835
UK MPs 1835–1837
UK MPs 1837–1841
UK MPs 1841–1847
Fellows of the Royal Society
Alumni of Trinity College, Cambridge
Senior Wranglers
Members of the Privy Council of the United Kingdom
Members of the Judicial Committee of the Privy Council